The following outline is provided as an overview of and topical guide to World War II:

World War II, or the Second World War was a global military conflict that was fought between September 1, 1939 and September 2, 1945. The war pitted two major military alliances against each other: the Allies of the United States, Soviet Union, United Kingdom, China and others against the Axis of Germany, Japan, Italy and others. Over 60 million people, the majority of them civilians, were killed, making it the deadliest conflict in human history.

The Second World War was known for modern warfare and tactics such as air warfare, strategic bombing, blitzkrieg and the first, and only, use of nuclear weapons in warfare. It is also known for the numerous war crimes committed during its duration, mostly by Axis forces but also by Allied forces, that left tens of millions of civilians dead through genocides, massacres and starvation; such as the Holocaust, Three Alls Policy, Genocide of ethnic Poles, Unit 731, Nanjing massacre, Hunger Plan and the Warsaw Uprising.

Causes of World War II

 World War I
 Treaty of Versailles
 Imperialism, expansionism and nationalism
 Expansionist nationalism
 Lebensraum
 Japanese nationalism
 Events preceding World War II in Europe
 Nazi Party
 Adolf Hitler
 Events preceding World War II in Asia
 Statism in Shōwa Japan
 Japanese invasion of Manchuria
 Xi'an Incident
 Second Sino-Japanese war

Participants in World War II

The Axis powers

Major Axis powers 

  Germany
  Japan
  Italy

Other Axis powers 
  Hungary
  Romania
  Slovakia
  Bulgaria
  Croatia
  Finland

The Allied powers

The 'Big Five' major allies 

  Soviet Union
  United States
  United Kingdom
  China
  France

Other major allies 
  Poland
  Yugoslavia
  Greece
  Canada
  Netherlands
  Belgium
  Czechoslovakia
  India
  Australia

People in World War II

Leaders in World War II

Axis leaders 

  Adolf Hitler – Führer (leader) of Germany
  Hirohito – Emperor of Japan
  Benito Mussolini – Prime Minister of Italy

Allied leaders 

  Joseph Stalin – Leader of the Soviet Union
  Franklin D. Roosevelt – President of the United States
  Winston Churchill – Prime Minister of the United Kingdom
  Chiang Kai-shek – Leader of China

Military forces of World War II
 List of World War II aces by country
 List of World War II air aces
 British 51st (Highland) Infantry Division (World War II)
 British Army Groups in WWII
 British Brigades in World War II
 British Corps in World War II
 17th Airborne Division
 18th Airborne Division
 Persecution of homosexuals in Nazi Germany and the Holocaust
 History of the Jews during World War II
 List of individuals and groups assisting Jews during the Holocaust
 American Minority Groups in World War II
 Hispanic Americans in World War II

Timeline of World War II

The following list includes some of the largest events in World War II:

1939 

 August 23: Germany and the Soviet Union sign a non-aggression pact
 September 1: Germany invades Poland, beginning the war
 September 3: War is declared on Germany by the United Kingdom and France, the Battle of the Atlantic and Phoney War begins
 September 17: After the Soviet Union defeats Japan in Mongolia, they invade Poland as well
 November 30: The Soviet Union invades Finland

1940 

 April 9: Germany invades Denmark and Norway
 May 10: Germany invades France and the low countries
 May 26: British troops evacuate Dunkirk
 July 10: Germany begins an air campaign against Britain
 September 7: Germany begins a major bombing campaign against Britain

1941 

 June 22: Germany invades the Soviet Union
 September 8: The Siege of Leningrad begins
 October 2: The Battle of Moscow begins
 December 7: Japan attacks Pearl Harbor, bringing the United States into the war

1942 

 February 8: Fall of Singapore
 May 4: Battle of the Coral Sea
 June 4: Battle of Midway
 July 1: First Battle of El Alamein
 July 17: Battle of Stalingrad
 August 19: Dieppe Raid
 October 23: Second Battle of El Alamein
 November 8: Operation Torch

1943 

 July 4: Battle of Kursk
 July 9: Allied invasion of Sicily
 September 3: Allied invasion of Italy and surrender of Italy

1944 

 January 17: Battle of Monte Cassino
 January 22: Landings at Anzio
 April 19: Operation Ichi-Go
 June 6: D-day
 June 22: Destruction of Army Group Center
 August 1: Warsaw Uprising
 August 15: Invasion of Southern France
 September 17: Operation Market Garden
 September 19: Battle of Hürtgen Forest
 October 23: Battle of Leyte Gulf
 December 16: Battle of the Bulge

1945 

 April 16 - May 2: Battle of Berlin
 May 8: Victory in Europe Day
 August 6 and 9: Atomic bombings of Hiroshima and Nagasaki
 August 15: Victory over Japan Day
 September 2: Surrender of Japan

World War II by region

Theatres and major campaigns

Europe 

 Eastern front
 Western front
 Mediterranean and Middle Eastern theatre
 Italian Campaign
 Arctic theatre
 Arctic convoys

Asia 

 Second Sino-Japanese War
 South-East Asian Theatre
 Pacific Ocean theatre

Africa 
For all theatres in Africa, see: 

 North African campaign
 West Africa campaign
 East African campaign

Other 
 Home front during World War II

By country

Europe 
 Albania
 Belarus
 Bulgaria
 Bulgarian resistance movement during World War II
 Carpathian Ruthenia
 Estonia
 Occupation of Estonia by Nazi Germany
 Finland
 France
 Germany
 Nazi Germany
 Gibraltar
 Greece
 Axis occupation of Greece during World War II
 Hungary
 Ireland
 Italy
 Italian Campaign
 Allied invasion of Sicily
 Allied invasion of Italy
 Latvia
 Occupation of Latvia by Nazi Germany
 Leningrad Oblast
 Netherlands
 Soviet Union
 Spain
 United Kingdom
 Yugoslavia
 Invasion of Yugoslavia
 Occupation of Baltic republics by Nazi Germany
 Occupation of Belarus by Nazi Germany
 Occupation of Denmark
 German occupation of the Channel Islands
 Orders, decorations, and medals of Nazi Germany
 History of Poland (1939–1945)
 Invasion of Poland
 Polish areas annexed by Nazi Germany
 Soviet invasion of Poland
 Slovak invasion of Poland
 Occupation of Poland (1939–1945)
 Administrative division of Polish territories during World War II
 War crimes in occupied Poland during World War II
 Polish culture during World War II
 Romania

Asia 
 Burma
 India
 Nepal
 Philippines
 Vietnam

Africa 
 Egypt
 South Africa
 Southern Rhodesia

Oceania 
 Australia
 New Zealand
 Axis naval activity in New Zealand waters

The Americas 
 United States
 Canada
 Greenland

War crimes 

The Second World War was characterized by many instances of War crimes:

Genocide

The Holocaust 

 Nazism
 Nazi Party
 Nazi eugenics
 Political views of Adolf Hitler
 Anti-Jewish legislation in prewar Nazi Germany
 Diary of Anne Frank
 Nazi book burnings
 Nazi ghettos
 Nazi concentration camps
 Nazi extermination camps
 Auschwitz
 Belzec
 Chełmno
 Majdanek
 Sobibor
 Treblinka
 History of Jews in Europe
 List of major perpetrators of the Holocaust
 Nazi human experimentation
 Racial policy of Nazi Germany

Other genocides 

 Nazi genocide of ethnic Poles
 Romani genocide

Massacres 

 Three Alls Policy
 Nanjing massacre
 Massacres during the Warsaw Uprising
 Wola massacre
 Ochota massacre
 Katyn massacre

Mistreatment of civilians 

 Comfort women
 Unit 731
 Rape during the occupation of Germany
 Population transfer in the Soviet Union

Technology during World War II

Technology during World War II
 German military technology during World War II
 Allied technological cooperation during World War II
 Technological escalation during World War II

Equipment of World War II
 Lists of World War II military equipment
 Equipment losses in World War II

Vehicles of World War II
 List of World War II military vehicles by country
 List of World War II military vehicles of Germany
 List of World War II ship classes
 List of World War II ships
 List of World War II ships of less than 1000 tons
 List of WW2 Luftwaffe aircraft by manufacturer
 List of aircraft of Italy, World War II
 List of aircraft of Japan, World War II
 List of aircraft of Russia, World War II
 List of aircraft of World War II
 List of aircraft of the French Air Force during World War II
 List of aircraft of the British, World War II
 List of aircraft of the Luftwaffe, World War II
 List of aircraft of the U.S. military, World War II
 List of armored fighting vehicles of World War II
 List of broadsides of major World War II ships
 List of undersea-carried planes during World War II
 List of weapons on Japanese combat aircraft
 List of prototype WWII combat vehicles
 List of foreign vehicles used by Nazi Germany in World War II
 List of helicopters used in World War II
 List of jet aircraft of World War II
 List of limited service World War II combat vehicles

Weapons of World War II 
 Nazi chocolate bar bomb
 Nazi belt buckle pistol

Other initiatives in World War II
 Nazi plunder

Propaganda during World War II
 American propaganda during World War II
 Walt Disney's World War II propaganda production
 List of Allied propaganda films of World War II
 British propaganda during World War II
 Nazi propaganda
 Soviet propaganda during World War II

Common military awards

Soviet Union 
 Hero of the Soviet Union
 Order of Lenin
 Order of Suvorov
 Order of the October Revolution
 Order of the Red Banner
 Order of Victory

United States
 Medal of Honor
 Purple Heart
 Silver Star
 Bronze Star
 Distinguished Flying Cross
 Air Medal
 World War II Victory Medal
 Asiatic-Pacific Campaign Medal
 European-African-Middle Eastern Campaign Medal
 American Campaign Medal

United Kingdom
 Victoria Cross
 Air Force Cross
 Order of the Bath
 Order of the British Empire
 Distinguished Flying Cross
 Africa Star
 Pacific Star

France and Belgium
 Croix de Guerre

Poland
 Cross of the Valorous
 Order of Polonia Restituta
 Virtuti Militari

Nazi Germany
 Iron Cross

Aftermath of World War II

The end of World War II 
 End of World War II in Europe
 End of World War II in the Pacific

Immediate events 

 War reparations
 Japanese reparations
 Forced labor of Germans in the Soviet Union
 Nuremberg trials

The post-war world 

 Cold War
 Emergence of United States and USSR as global superpowers
 NATO
 Warsaw Pact
 Iron Curtain
 Proxy wars
 Decolonization
 Post–World War II baby boom
 Pursuit of Nazi collaborators
 World War II in popular culture

See also 

 Lists of World War II topics
 Opposition to World War II
 Outline of war
 Outline of World War I

Notes

References

Bibliography

External links

 Directories
 Yahoo—"World War II"
 Directory of Online World War II Indexes & Records
 WWW-VL: History: WWII
 General
 World War II Database
 The Second World War—Spartacus Educational
 Deutsche Welle special section on World War II created by one of Germany's public broadcasters on World War II and the world 60 years after.
 Canada and WWII
 End of World War II in Germany
 World War II Encyclopedia by the History Channel
 World War II Awards and their recipients.
 Media
 U.S. National Archives Photos
 World War II Poster Collection  hosted by the University of North Texas Libraries' *Digital Collections
 World War II Propaganda Leaflet Archive
 World War 2 Pictures In Colour 

 Multimedia map—Presentation that covers the war from the invasion of the Soviet Union to the fall of Berlin
 Radio news from 1938 to 1945
 The Art of War Online Exhibition at the UK National Archive
On-line documents
 World War II Military Situation Maps. Library of Congress
 After Action Reports (AAR’s) and other official documents about the American Divisions during the Second World War
 Maps from the Pacific and Italian theaters
 Officially Declassified U.S. Government Documents about World War II  
 The Soviet History of World War II, 28 October 1959—Central Intelligence Agency, Office of Current Intelligence.
 Daily German action reports
 Stories
 WW2 People's War—A project by the BBC to gather the stories of ordinary people from World War II
 Documentaries
 The World at War (1974) is a 26-part Thames Television series that covers most aspects of World War II from many points of view. It includes interviews with many key figures (Karl Dönitz, Albert Speer, Anthony Eden etc.) (Imdb link)
 The Second World War in Colour (1999) is a three episode documentary showing unique footage in color (Imdb link)
 Battlefield (documentary series) is a television documentary series initially issued in 1994–1995 that explores many of the most important battles fought during the Second World War. The War'' (2007) is 7-part PBS documentary recounting the experiences of a number of individuals from American communities.

World War II
World War II
outline